Pasivedala railway station (station code:PSDA), is an Indian Railways station in Pasivedala, a village in West Godavari district of Andhra Pradesh. It lies on the Vijayawada–Chennai section and is administered under Vijayawada railway division of South Central Railway zone. 18 trains halt in this station every day. It is the 2607th-busiest station in the country.

History 
The southern part of the West Coast State Railway (from Waltair to Vijayawada) was taken over by Madras Railway in 1901.

PASIVEDALA railway station is connected to many villages like Chagallu Sugar factory, Meenanagaram, Pangidi, Vemuluru, Nandamuru, Mallavaram, Chandravaram etc.,

PASIVEDALA station was halt at present for normal and general passenger trains only. No express trains are now halted here.

Before 1979, some express trains were having hault in this station. Names of those trains were: CIRCAR EXPRESS, CHENNAI-HOWRAH MAIL, JANATHA EXPRESS, PURI TIRUPATI EXPRESS ETC.,

Honourable ALAPATI CHENCHYYA (member of railway board at those times) belonged to this village.

References

External links 

Railway stations in West Godavari district
Vijayawada railway division